This is a list of notable classical violinists from the baroque era to the 21st century.

For a more comprehensive list of contemporary classical violinists, see List of contemporary classical violinists.

Baroque era

 Johann Sebastian Bach (1685–1750)
 Thomas Baltzar (c. 1630–1663)
 Heinrich Ignaz Franz Biber (1644–1704)
 Pasquale Bini (1716–1770)
 Arcangelo Corelli (1653–1713)
 Evaristo Felice Dall'Abaco (1675–1742)
 Matthew Dubourg (1707–1767)
 André-Joseph Exaudet (1710–1762)
 Carlo Farina (1600–1640)
 Francesco Geminiani (1687–1762)
 Louis-Gabriel Guillemain (1705–1770)
 Jean-Marie Leclair (1697–1764)
 Pietro Locatelli (1695–1764)
 Jean-Baptiste Lully (1632–1687)
 Francesco Manfredini (1684–1762)
 Nicola Matteis (1670–1714)
 Davis Mell (1604–1662)
 Jean-Joseph de Mondonville (1711–1772)
 Johann Georg Pisendel (1687–1755)
 Johann Heinrich Schmelzer (1623–1680)
 Giovanni Battista Somis (1686–1763)
 Giuseppe Tartini (1692–1770)
 Carlo Tessarini (1690–1765)
 Giuseppe Torelli (1658–1709)
 Francesco Maria Veracini (1690–1768)
 Giovanni Battista Vitali (1632–1692)
 Tomaso Antonio Vitali (1663–1745)
 Antonio Vivaldi (1678–1741)

Classical era

 Leopold August Abel (1717–1794)
 Jean Ancot Jnr (1799–1829)
 Pierre Baillot (1771–1842)
 Charles Frederick Baumgarten (1739–1840)
 Franz Benda (1709–1786)
 Antonio Bartolomeo Bruni (1757–1821)
 Bartolomeo Campagnoli (1751–1827)
 Christian Cannabich (1731–1798)
 Franz Clement (1780–1842)
 Richard Cudmore (1787–1840)
 Ernst Christoph Dressler (1734–1779)
 Domenico Ferrari (1722–1780)
 Ferdinand Fränzl (1767–1833)
 Ignaz Fränzl (1736–1811)
 Pierre Gaviniès (1728–1800)
 Eugène Godecharle (1742–1798)
 Jean-Jacques Grasset (c. 1769–1839)
 Johann Gottlieb Graun (1703–1771)
 François Habeneck (1781–1849)
 Joseph Haydn (1732–1809)
 Thaddäus Huber (1742–1798)
 Ivan Mane Jarnović (1747–1804)
 Rodolphe Kreutzer (1766–1831)
 Thomas Linley the younger (1756–1778)
 Antonio Lolli (1730–1802)
 Heinrich August Matthaei (1781–1835)
 Jean-Joseph de Mondonville (1711–1772)
 Leopold Mozart (1719–1787)
 Wolfgang Amadeus Mozart (1756–1791)
 Pietro Nardini (1722–1793)
 Thomas Pinto (1728–1773)
 Friedrich Wilhelm Pixis (1786–1842)
 Gaetano Pugnani (1731–1798)
 Pierre Rode (1774–1830)
 Alessandro Rolla (1757–1841)
 Antonio Rolla (1798–1837)
 Ignaz Schuppanzigh (1776–1830)
 Anton Stamitz (1754–1796)
 Carl Stamitz (1745–1801)
 Johann Stamitz (1717–1757)
 Regina Strinasacchi (c. 1761–1839)
 Luigi Tomasini (1741–1808)
 Giovanni Battista Viotti (1755–1824)

Romantic era

 Jean-Delphin Alard (1815–1888)
 Leopold Auer (1845–1930)
 Stanisław Barcewicz (1858–1929)
 Antonio Bazzini (1818–1897)
 Dora Valesca Becker (1870–1958)
 Antonín Bennewitz (1833–1926)
 Charles Auguste de Bériot (1802–1870)
 Franz Berwald (1796–1868)
 Casimir von Blumenthal (1787–1849)
 Joseph von Blumenthal (1782–1856)
 Alexandre Boucher (1770–1861)
 George Bridgetower (1778–1860)
 Adolph Brodsky (1851–1929)
 Ole Bull (1810–1880)
 Kate Chaplin (1865–1948)
 Julius Conus (1869–1942)
 Mathieu Crickboom (1871–1947)
 Alfredo D'Ambrosio (1871–1914)
 Charles Dancla (1817–1907)
 Joseph Dando (1806–1894)
 Ferdinand David (1810–1873)
 Alfred De Sève (1858–1927)
 Jakob Dont (1815–1888)
 František Drdla (1868–1944)
 Heinrich Wilhelm Ernst (1814–1865)
 Friedrich Ernst Fesca (1789–1826)
 Nahan Franko (1861–1930)
 Sam Franko (1857–1937)
 Jules Garcin (1830–1896)
 François Habeneck (1781–1849)
 Karel Halíř (1859–1909)
 Carl Heissler (1823–1878)
 Joseph Hellmesberger Jr. (1855–1907)
 Joseph Hellmesberger Sr. (1828–1893)
 Philip A. Herfort (1851–1921)
 Willy Hess (1859–1939)
 Karl Holz ( 1798–1858)
 Jenő Hubay (1858–1937)
 Frantz Jehin-Prume (1839–1899)
 Joseph Joachim (1831–1907)
 Paul Klengel (1854–1935)
 Franz Kneisel (1865–1926)
 Jan Koert (1853–1911)
 Apollinaire de Kontski (1825–1879)
 Franjo Krežma (1862–1881)
 Charles Philippe Lafont (1781–1839)
 Walborg Lagerwall (1851–1940)
 Hubert Léonard (1819–1890)
 Karol Lipiński (1790–1862)
 John David Loder (1788–1846)
 David Mannes (1866–1959)
 Martin Pierre Marsick (1847–1924)
 Oscar Martel (1848–1924)
 Lambert Massart (1811–1892)
 Ludwig Wilhelm Maurer (1789–1878)
 Joseph Mayseder (1789–1863)
 Jacques Féréol Mazas (1782–1849)
 Maria Milanollo (1832–1848)
 Teresa Milanollo (1827–1904)
 Jesús de Monasterio (1836–1903)
 Ovide Musin (1854–1929)
 Tivadar Nachéz (1859–1930)
 Wilma Neruda (1839–1911)
 Ottokar Nováček (1866–1900)
 Niccolò Paganini (1782–1840)
 Heinrich Panofka (1807–1887)
 Guido Papini (1847–1912)
 Maud Powell (1867–1920)
 François Prume (1816–1849)
 Léon Reynier (1833–1895)
 Oskar Rieding (1840–1918)
 Franz Ries (1846–1932)
 Achille Rivarde (1865–1940)
 Engelbert Röntgen (1829–1897)
 Pablo de Sarasate (1844–1908)
 Émile Sauret (1852–1920)
 Eugène Sauzay (1809–1901) 
 Marianne Stresow Scharwenka (1856–1918)
 Henry Schradieck (1846–1918)
 François Schubert (1808–1878)
 Fritz (Friedrich) Seitz (1848–1918)
 Arma Senkrah (1864–1900)
 Otakar Ševčík (1852–1934)
 Emily Shinner (1862–1901)
 Ödön (Edmund) Singer (1830–1912)
 Camillo Sivori (1818–1894)
 Theodore Spiering (1871–1925)
 Louis Spohr (1784–1859)
 Ludwig Straus (1835–1899)
 Johann Strauss I (1804–1849)
 Johann Strauss II (1825–1899)
 Josef Suk (1874–1935)
 César Thomson (1857–1931)
 Camilla Urso (1840–1902)
 Carl Venth (1860–1938)
 Henri Vieuxtemps (1820–1881)
 José White (1835–1918)
 Henryk Wieniawski (1835–1880)
 Gabriele Wietrowetz (1866–1937)
 August Wilhelmj (1845–1908)
 Eugène Ysaÿe (1858–1931)

20th–21st centuries
Note: This does not include living violinists, who are listed at List of contemporary classical violinists. 

 Joseph Achron (1886–1943)
 Murray Adaskin (1906–2002)
 Anahid Ajemian (1924–2016)
 Samuel Antek (1909–1958)
 Jelly d'Arányi (1893–1966)
 Helen Armstrong (1943–2006)
 Michèle Auclair (1924–2005)
 Florence Austin (1884–1927)
 Sol Babitz (1911–1982)
 Oskar Back (1879–1963)
 Ik-Hwan Bae (1956–2014)
 Israel Baker (1919–2011)
 Vera Barstow (1891–1975)
 Walter Barylli (1921–2022)
 Hugh Bean (1929–2003)
 Louise Behrend (1916–2011)
 Nina Beilina (1937–2018)
 Leon Belasco (1902–1988)
 Franz Benteler (1925–2010)
 Luigi Alberto Bianchi (1945–2018)
 Petrowitsch Bissing (1871–1961)
 Serge Blanc (1929–2013)
 Harry Blech (1909–1999)
 Naoum Blinder (1889–1965)
 Harry Bluestone (1907–1992)
 Lola Bobesco (1921–2003)
 Emanuel Borok (1944–2020)
 Willi Boskovsky (1909–1991)
 Jules Boucherit (1877–1962)
 Norbert Brainin (1923–2005)
 Maggy Breittmayer (1888–1961)
 Robert Brink (1924–2014)
 Jascha Brodsky (1907–1997)
 Antonio Brosa (1894–1979)
 Alexander Brott (1915–2005)
 Iona Brown (1941–2004)
 Anshel Brusilow (1928–2018)
 Gerda von Bülow (1904–1990)
 Richard Burgin (1892–1981)
 Grace Burrows (1893–1980)
 Adolf Busch (1891–1952)
 Guila Bustabo (1916–2002)
 Alfredo Campoli (1906–1991)
 Mary Canberg (1918–2004)
 Lucien Capet (1873–1928)
 Arthur Catterall (1883–1943)
 Suzanne Chaigneau (1875–1946)
 Albert Chamberland (1886–1975)
 Eugène Chartier (1893–1963)
 Alexander Chuhaldin (1892–1951)
 Nicolas Chumachenco (1944–2020)
 Stephen Clapp (1939–2014)
 Isidore Cohen (1922–2005)
 Raymond Cohen (1919–2011)
 Alexander Cores (1901–1994)
 Joey Corpus (1958–2017)
 Peter Cropper (1945–2015)
 Marcel Darrieux (1891–1989)
 Lukas David (1934–2021)
 Dorothy DeLay (1917–2002)
 Gioconda de Vito (1907–1994)
 Grigoraș Dinicu (1889–1949)
 Joseph Douglass (1871–1935)
 Rafael Druian (1923–2002)
 Samuel Dushkin (1891–1976)
 Sophie-Carmen Eckhardt-Gramatté (1898–1974)
 Arnold Eidus (1922–2013)
 Mischa Elman (1891–1967)
 George Enescu (1881–1955)
 Broadus Erle (1918–1977)
 Toshiya Eto (1927–2008)
 Adila Fachiri (1886–1962)
 Ilona Fehér (1901–1988)
 Aldo Ferraresi (1902–1978)
 Christian Ferras (1933–1982)
 Mikhail Fichtenholz (1920–1985)
 Joan Field (1915–1988)
 António Fortunato de Figueiredo (1903–1981)
 Jorja Fleezanis (1952–2022)
 Eugene Fodor (1950–2011)
 Vera Fonaroff (1883–1962)
 Zino Francescatti (1902–1991)
 Stefan Frenkel (1902–1979)
 Walter Fried (1877–1925)
 Erick Friedman (1939–2004)
 Joseph Fuchs (1899–1997)
 Marjorie Fulton (1909–1962)
 Ivan Galamian (1903–1981)
 Felix Galimir (1910–1999)
 Samuel Gardner (1891–1984)
 John Georgiadis (1939–2021)
 Robert Gerle (1924–2005)
 André Gertler (1907–1998)
 Stefi Geyer (1888–1956)
 Elizabeth Gilels (1919–2008)
 Zinaida Gilels (1924–2000)
 Bronislav Gimpel (1911–1979)
 Josef Gingold (1909–1995)
 Ivry Gitlis (1922–2020)
 Thelma Given (1896–1977)
 Carroll Glenn (1918–1983)
 Raymond Gniewek (1931–2021)
 Paul Godwin (1902–1982)
 Szymon Goldberg (1909–1993)
 Boris Goldstein (1922–1987)
 Jascha Gopinko (1891–1980)
 Alexei Gorokhov (1927–1999)
 Barry Griffiths (1939–2020)
 Sidney Griller (1911–1993)
 Frederick Grinke (1911–1987)
 Erich Gruenberg (1924–2020)
 Arthur Grumiaux (1921–1986)
 Daniel Guilet (1899–1990)
 Boris Gutnikov (1931–1986)
 Ida Haendel (1928–2020)
 Betty-Jean Hagen (1930–2016)
 Heimo Haitto (1925–1999)
 Marie Hall (1884–1956)
 Sandor Harmati (1892–1936)
 Cecilia Hansen (1897–1989)
 Alice Harnoncourt (1930–2022)
 Margaret Harrison (1899–1995)
 May Harrison (1890–1959)
 Sidney Harth (1925–2011)
 Josef Hassid (1923–1950)
 Kató Havas (1920–2018)
 Yaëla Hertz (1930–2014)
 Julius Hegyi (1923–2007)
 Jascha Heifetz (1901–1987)
 Philippe Hirschhorn (1946–1996)
 Rosa Hochmann (1875–1955)
 Henry Holst (1899–1991)
 Bronisław Huberman (1882–1947)
 Emanuel Hurwitz (1919–2006)
 Jacques Israelievitch (1948–2015)
 Sascha Jacobsen (1895–1972)
 Piotr Janowski (1951–2008)
 Philip S. Johnson (1953–2011)
 Oleg Kagan (1946–1990)
 Kaoru Kakudo (1947–2004)
 Louis Kaufman (1905–1994)
 Daisy Kennedy (1893–1981)
 Eda Kersey (1904–1944)
 Felix Khuner (1906–1991)
 Valery Klimov (1931–2022)
 Daniel Kobialka (1943–2021)
 Paul Kochanski (1887–1934)
 Dmitri Kogan (1978–2017)
 Leonid Kogan (1924–1982)
 Felix Kok (1924–2010)
 Adolph Koldofsky (1905–1951)
 Rudolf Kolisch (1896–1978)
 Péter Komlós (1935–2017)
 Anton Kontra (1932–2020)
 Hugo Kortschak (1884–1957)
 Boris Koutzen (1901–1966)
 Dénes Kovács (1930–2005)
 Tosca Kramer (1903–1976)
 Herman Krebbers (1923–2018)
 Fritz Kreisler (1875–1962)
 Jan Kubelík (1880–1940)
 Georg Kulenkampff (1898–1948)
 Jaakko Kuusisto (1974–2022)
 Helen Kwalwasser (1927–2017)
 Fredell Lack (1922–2017)
 Jeanne Lamon (1949–2021)
 Isidor Lateiner (1930–2005)
 Remo Lauricella (1912–2003)
 Arthur Leavins (1917–1995)
 Everett Lee (1916–2022)
 Sylvia Lent (1903–1972)
 Ida Levin (1963–2016)
 Walter Levin (1924–2017)
 Nona Liddell (1927–2017)
 Maria Lidka (1914–2013)
 Ernest Llewellyn (1915–1982)
 Lea Luboshutz (1885–1965)
 Sergiu Luca (1943–2010)
 Alberto Lysy (1935–2009)
 Francis MacMillen (1885–1973)
 Klaus Maetzl (1941–2016)
 Hugh Maguire (1926–2013)
 Paul Makanowitzky (1920–1998)
 Juan Manén (1883–1971)
 Robert Mann (1920–2018)
 Henri Marteau (1874–1934)
 Lucien Martin (1908–1950)
 Johanna Martzy (1924–1979)
 Leonora Jackson McKim (1879–1969)
 Ivor McMahon (1924–1972)
 Alfred Eugene Megerlin (1880–1941)
 Wilhelm Melcher (1940–2005)
 Isolde Menges (1893–1976)
 Yehudi Menuhin (1916–1999)
 Roberto Michelucci (1922–2010)
 Martin Milner (1928–2000)
 Nathan Milstein (1903–1992)
 Mischa Mischakoff (1895–1981)
 Emil Młynarski (1870–1935)
 Cyril Monk (1882–1970)
 Alma Moodie (1898–1943)
 Lydia Mordkovitch (1944–2014)
 Erika Morini  (1904–1995)
 Alfonso Mosesti (1924–2018)
 Konstantin Mostras (1886–1965)
 Peter Mountain (1923–2013)
 David Nadien (1926–2014)
 Yfrah Neaman (1923–2003)
 Sheila Nelson (1936–2020)
 Ginette Neveu (1919–1949)
 Siegmund Nissel (1922–2008)
 Ricardo Odnoposoff (1914–2004)
 David Oistrakh (1908–1974)
 Igor Oistrakh (1931–2021)
 Edgar Ortenberg (1900–1996)
 Trond Øyen (1929–1999)
 Michaela Paetsch (1961–2023)
 Priscilla Paetsch (1931–2017)
 Margaret Pardee (1920–2016)
 Manoug Parikian (1920–1987)
 Kathleen Parlow (1890–1963)
 Barbara Penny (1929–2007)
 Louis Persinger (1887–1966)
 Maximilian Pilzer (1890–1958)
 Alfred Pochon (1878–1959)
 Max Pollikoff (1904–1984)
 Enrico Polo (1868–1953)
 Miron Polyakin (1895–1941)
 Katia Popov (1965–2018)
 Ruth Posselt (1914–2007)
 Jean Pougnet (1907–1968)
 Gaston Poulet (1892–1974)
 Albert Pratz (1914–1995)
 Mikhail Press (1871–1938)
 Váša Příhoda (1900–1960)
 Simon Pullman (1890–1942)
 Manuel Quiroga (1892–1961)
 Michael Rabin (1936–1972)
 Rosemary Rapaport (1918–2011)
 Ossy Renardy (1920–1953)
 Florizel von Reuter (1890–1985)
 Ruggiero Ricci (1918–2012)
 Amadeo Roldán (1900–1939)
 Aaron Rosand (1927–2019)
 Alma Rosé (1906–1944)
 Arnold Rosé (1863–1946)
 Eric Rosenblith (1920–2010)
 Max Rostal (1905–1991)
 Olga Rudge (1895–1996)
 Albert Sammons (1886–1957)
 David Sarser (1921–2013)
 Egon Sassmannshaus (1928–2010)
 Hansheinz Schneeberger (1926–2019)
 Wolfgang Schneiderhan (1915–2002)
 Dina Schneidermann (1931–2016)
 Jaap Schröder (1925–2020)
 Michel Schwalbé (1919–2012)
 Toscha Seidel (1899–1962)
 Berl Senofsky (1926–2002)
 Samuel Sherman (1871–1948)
 Nelli Shkolnikova (1928–2010)
 Oscar Shumsky (1917–2000)
 Joseph Silverstein (1932–2015)
 Julian Sitkovetsky (1925–1958)
 Semyon Snitkovsky (1933–1981)
 Marie Soldat-Roeger (1863–1955)
 Denise Soriano-Boucherit (1916–2006)
 Leonard Sorkin (1916–1985)
 Eduard Sõrmus (1878–1940)
 Albert Spalding (1883–1953)
 Tossy Spivakovsky (1906–1998)
 Christian Stadelmann (1959–2019)
 Ethel Stark (1910–2012)
 Benjamin Steinberg (1915–1974)
 Hellmut Stern (1928–2020)
 Isaac Stern (1920–2001)
 Pyotr Stolyarsky (1871–1944)
 Josef Suk (1929–2011)
 Harold Sumberg (1905–1994)
 Suwa Nejiko (1920–2012)
 Zoltán Székely (1903–2001)
 Henryk Szeryng (1918–1988)
 Joseph Szigeti (1892–1973)
 Gerhard Taschner (1922–1976)
 Henri Temianka (1906–1992)
 Jean Ter-Merguerian (1935–2015)
 Jacques Thibaud (1880–1953)
 Roman Totenberg (1911–2012)
 Andor Toth (1925–2006)
 Charles Treger (1935–2023)
 Anahit Tsitsikian (1926–1999)
 Masuko Ushioda (1942–2013)
 Tibor Varga (1921–2003)
 Franz von Vecsey (1893–1935)
 Sándor Végh (1912–1997)
 Ion Voicu (1923–1997)
 William Waterhouse (1917–2003)
 Clarence Cameron White (1880–1960)
 Elise Fellows White (1873–1953)
 Camilla Wicks (1928–2020)
 Margaret Jones Wiles (1911–2000)
 Maurice Wilk (1922–1963)
 Wanda Wiłkomirska (1929–2018)
 Harold Wippler (1928–2022)
 Endre Wolf (1913–2011)
 Josef Wolfsthal (1899–1931)
 Rowsby Woof (1883–1943)
 Cedric Wright (1889–1959)
 Arthur Wynne (1871–1945)
 Yuri Yankelevich (1909–1973)
 Florian ZaBach (1918–2006)
 Zvi Zeitlin (1922–2012)
 Grigori Zhislin (1945–2017)
 Efrem Zimbalist (1889–1985)
 Olive Zorian (1916–1965)
 Paul Zukofsky (1943–2017)

Comedic
As a supplement to the lists above, the following is a list of violinists who were known for playing the instrument badly in support of comedy routines.

 Jack Benny (1894–1974)
 Larry Fine (1902–1975)
 Henny Youngman (1906–1998)

Contemporary
 See List of contemporary classical violinists

Female
 See List of female violinists

Further reading
 The Art of Violin Playing Books 1 & 2, Carl Flesch. Edited by Eric Rosenblith. Carl Fischer Music  and 
 The Armenian Bowing Art, Anahit Tsitsikian,Published by “Edit Print” print house Yerevan, 2004.(in Russian)
 The Art of Violin Playing, Daniel Melsa, Foulsham & Co. Ltd.
 Biographical Notice of Nicolo Paganini, by F.J. Fétis (c. 1880), Schott & Co.
 The Book of the Violin, edited by Dominic Gill (1984), Phaidon Press.  
 The Devil's Box-Masters of Southern Fiddling by Charles Wolfe (1997), Country Music Foundation Press. 
 An Encyclopedia of the Violin, by Alberto Bachmann (1965/1990), Da Capo Press. 
 The Great Violinists, by Margaret Campbell (1980/2004), Robson Books.  
 Paganini-The Genoese, by G.I.C. de Courcy (1957), University of Oklahoma Press
 Stuff Smith-Pure at Heart, edited by Anthony Barnett & Eva Løgager (1991), Allardyce Barnett Publishers. 
 Szigeti on the Violin, by Joseph Szigeti (1969/1979), Dover Publications.  
 Tartini-His Life and Times, by Prof. Dr. Lev Ginsburg (1968), Paganiniana Publications Inc. 
 Unfinished Journey, Yehudi Menuhin (1976), Macdonald and Jane's.  
 The Violin, by Yehudi Menuhin (1996), Flammarion.  
 The Violin: A Social History of the World's Most Versatile Instrument by Schoenbaum, David (2012). New York, New York : W.W. Norton & Company. 
 The Violin and I, by Kato Havas (1968/1975), Bosworth & Co. Ltd.
 Violin Playing-As I Teach it, by Leopold Auer (1921/1960), Gerarld Duckworth & Co Ltd.
 Violins & Violinists, by Franz Farga (1950), Rockliff Publishing Corporation Ltd.
 Ysaÿe, by Prof. Dr. Lev Ginsburg (1980), Paganiniana Publications Inc.

External links
 Legendary Violinists (a public arts website)
 Famous Violinists of To-day and Yesterday by Henry Charles Lahee, an 1889 publication at Project Gutenberg
 Violinists and Violists on the Web Alphabetical listings of web pages on string players, past and present.

 
Classical

cs:Seznam houslistů
it:Violinisti
nl:Lijst van beroemde violisten